Wraysbury Reservoir is a water supply reservoir for London, just west of the M25 near the village of Wraysbury, and directly under the western approach path of Heathrow Airport. The reservoir was begun in 1967 and completed by W. & C. French in 1970 with a capacity of 34,000 million litres (8,000 million gallons).

Engineering design data for the Wraysbury reservoir is as follows.

The reservoir is owned and operated by Thames Water; 400 million litres (100 million gallons) of water are pumped daily from an inlet at Datchet on the River Thames. A neighbouring reservoir is the King George VI Reservoir, opened in 1947, which is supplied from Hythe End. To keep the grass short and make inspections easier, Thames Water maintains a flock of sheep on the earthen banks.

The reservoir is the site of the National Physical Laboratory's Open-Water Test Facility, used by the Ministry of Defence for test and calibration of sonar systems, as well as civilian commercial customers.
 
It is a  biological Site of Special Scientific Interest and part of South West London Waterbodies Ramsar site and Special Protection Area. It has nationally important numbers of wintering cormorants, great crested grebe and shovelers. It also supports many gadwalls.

See also
London water supply infrastructure

References

Infrastructure completed in 1970
Ramsar sites in England
Reservoirs in Surrey
Sites of Special Scientific Interest in Surrey
Special Protection Areas in England
Thames Water reservoirs
1970 establishments in England
Drinking water reservoirs in England